Donna Moore (born 1980) is a British strongwoman and winner of the 2016, 2017, and 2019 World's Strongest Woman competitions, the 2016 and 2017 Arnold World Strongwoman champion, and 2018 Arnold Pro Strongwoman champion.

Records
2018: Women's Atlas Stone 2018 (No Tacky), 147 kg

Moore is the World Record holder for the Ardblair Stones set at the 2019 Highland Games& Rattray Highland Games with a time of 37.14 seconds.

On 27 September 2020 Moore set a world record for the Women's Castle Atlas stone with a 170 kg lift at the Rogue Fitness Record Breakers.

Personal life
Moore is a single mother of two children, and is from Colburn, North Yorkshire, in England. She has been competing since 2012.

References

Strongwomen
Living people
1980 births